The Johns Hopkins Science Review is a US television series about science that was produced at Johns Hopkins University in Baltimore, Maryland from 1948-1955. Starting in 1950, the series aired on the DuMont Television Network until the network's demise in 1955. The series' creator was Lynn Poole, who wrote or co-wrote most of its episodes and acted as the on-camera host.

The original series was followed by three related series produced by Poole at Johns Hopkins University: Tomorrow (1955), Tomorrow's Careers (1955-1956), and Johns Hopkins File 7 (1956-1960). Johns Hopkins University ended its production of television series in 1960.

Broadcast history
The original series aired from March 9, 1948, to March 6, 1955. Initially, the show was broadcast only in the Baltimore area. Starting with the December 17, 1948, episode, shows were broadcast by CBS from stations along the East Coast.

As was typical in the early days of television broadcasting, each show was broadcast live from a studio at Johns Hopkins University. Each week's show involved one or more guests, often from the Johns Hopkins faculty and staff. Poole acted as the host and interviewer. The guest might show how a scientific apparatus such an electron microscope or an oscilloscope worked, or would briefly explain scientific ideas to the viewers. In the December 5, 1950, episode, the live broadcast of a fluoroscope screen was used by doctors in New York and Chicago to diagnose the injuries to a machinist in the hospital in Baltimore. In the April 21, 1952, episode, a scientist drank a solution containing the radioactive isotope of iodine, and then followed its progress in his own body with a Geiger counter. The guests were sometimes national figures like Wernher von Braun (October 20, 1952), George Gamov, and Harold Urey. The show famously showed a live birth and gave instructions to women viewers about breast self-examination.

Each half-hour episode was broadcast from WAAM in Baltimore. The series moved to the DuMont Television Network in November 1949 through station WMAR. The program aired Tuesdays at 8:30 pm EST during the 1950-51 season, Mondays at 8:30pm EST during the 1951-52 season, and Wednesdays at 8pm EST during the 1952-53 season. According to the 1953-54 United States network television schedule, the show remained in the Wednesday at 8pm EST slot for the 1953-54 season.

The series would win the network Peabody Awards in 1950 (honorable mention) and 1952.

A spin-off program, Johns Hopkins File 7, aired on a syndicated basis from 1956 to 1960. Like the Review, File 7 was broadcast by WAAM and featured host Lynn Poole.

Archives
Approximately 303 episodes of the original series were made. There are records of 238 episodes, and kinescope films from 186 episodes, stored in Special Collections of the Milton Eisenhower Library at Johns Hopkins University. This means it has the most surviving episodes of any DuMont Network program. The earliest surviving kinescope is from November 21, 1950. At least three episodes survive at the UCLA Film and Television Archive.

In addition, Johns Hopkins University has records and films of the three successor series.

Retrospective reception 
In 2002, Patrick Lucanio and Gary Coville wrote that, "In retrospect, Lynn Poole created one of those unique series that allowed television to fulfill its idealized mission as both an educational and an entertainment medium." Johns Hopkins Magazine declared in 2019 that the show was "ahead of its time" for its frank approach to educating its viewers on matter of science, especially biology.

See also
List of programs broadcast by the DuMont Television Network
List of surviving DuMont Television Network broadcasts
1950-51 United States network television schedule
1951-52 United States network television schedule
1952-53 United States network television schedule
1953-54 United States network television schedule

References

Further reading
 A book about the series by a co-producer.

External links
 
 Several episodes of The Johns Hopkins Science Review and videos about the show were formerly available at Research Channel.
 Several public domain episodes of The Johns Hopkins Science Review can be viewed on the Internet Archive. These include Concrete With Muscles, Don't Drink that Water, Usefulness of Useless Knowledge, A visit to our Studio The Master Glass Blower, and Great Men of Science.

1948 American television series debuts
1955 American television series endings
Science education television series
American educational television series
Black-and-white American television shows
CBS original programming
DuMont Television Network original programming
English-language television shows
Johns Hopkins University
Peabody Award-winning television programs
Television shows filmed in Maryland